Jack Aungier (born 20 November 1998) is an Irish rugby union player who currently plays for Connacht Rugby. He plays as a prop.

Early life
Aungier attended St. Fintan's High School and participated in the Leinster Schools Rugby Senior Cup with the school. At the age of just 16, Aungier made his debut for the Ireland under-18s team.

Leinster
Whilst still in Leinster's academy, Aungier was selected on the bench for their round 5 2019–20 Pro14 fixture against Welsh side Dragons on 1 November 2019, and he replaced Michael Bent in the 52nd minute in the provinces 50–15 win.

Connacht
In May of 2020, it was reported that Aungier would be joining Connacht Rugby during the then postponed 2019/2020 Pro14 season. 
He made his debut for Connacht against Ulster during the resumed Pro14 season on the 23rd of August 2020, scoring the final try of a bonus point victory for the province.

References

External links
Leinster Academy Profile
Pro14 Profile

1998 births
Living people
Irish rugby union players
Connacht Rugby players
Leinster Rugby players
Rugby union props
Rugby union players from Dublin (city)
People educated at St. Fintan's High School